Jason Demetriou (born 13 January 1976) is a professional rugby league coach who is the head coach of the South Sydney Rabbitohs in the NRL and a former professional rugby league footballer.

He has previously held head coaching jobs at the Keighley Cougars, Northern Pride and Illawarra Cutters and has been an assistant coach for the St George Illawarra Dragons, Brisbane Broncos and North Queensland Cowboys, where he was on the coaching staff that won the 2015 NRL Grand Final.

Playing career

Early career
Born in Sydney, Demetriou grew up in the St George area of Sydney and supported the Balmain Tigers as a child. As a teen, Demetriou played in the Harold Matthews Cup and S.G. Ball Cup for the St George Dragons. From there Demetriou moved to the Newtown Jets, where he played for their Metropolitan Cup side and later the Bondi Roosters, before moving to England in December 1999. In 2000, Demetriou played for the now-defunct Lancashire Lynx and the Rochdale Hornets.

Widnes Vikings
In 2001, Demetriou joined the Widnes Vikings in the second division Northern Ford Premiership, with side gaining promotion to the Super League in Demetriou's first season with club and Demetriou being named the 2001 Northern Ford Premiership Overseas Player of the Year.

Wakefield Trinity Wildcats
In 2004, Demetriou joined the Wakefield Trinity Wildcats (captain) (Heritage № 1213) where he spent the next seven seasons, captaining the club for five of those seasons. In doing so, he became the first Australian player without NRL experience to captain a Super League team.

In 2006, he was named Wakefield Trinity Wildcat's Player of the Year. That season he scored a late try against local rivals, the Castleford Tigers, to keep Wakefield Trinity Wildcats in the Super League, simultaneously relegating Castleford Tigers. The moment was captured and a large copy of the photo is on display outside the coach's office at Belle Vue.

In 2007, he was named as Wakefield Trinity Wildcats's Player of the Year again. He was also named at centre in the Super League Dream Team, and was short-listed for the Man of Steel award along with Trent Barrett and James Roby.

In 2009, he wore the number 8 jersey for Wakefield Trinity Wildcats, in memory of his close friend Adam Watene. Demetriou is associated with the Adam Watene Fund, helping raise funds for his family in New Zealand. In 2010, he was awarded a 3-month testimonial at the Wakefield Trinity Wildcats as a reward for his hard work and dedication to English rugby league.

Coaching career
Demetriou's contract with Wakefield Trinity Wildcats expired at the end of 2010, and he was told that it would not be renewed. He initially joined the York City Knights for 2011, but a subsequent offer as player-coach for Keighley Cougars arose, and was accepted. In his first season in charge, Keighley gained promotion to the Kingstone Press Championship.

Demetriou returned to Australia in 2013, becoming the head coach for the Northern Pride in the Queensland Cup. During his two seasons at the Pride, the club won back-to-back minor premierships, the 2014 Queensland Cup Grand Final and the inaugural NRL State Championship game. In 2014, he coached the Queensland Residents side, who defeated the NSW Cup rep side 24–16.

In October 2014, Demetriou joined the North Queensland Cowboys as an assistant coach. On 4 October 2015, Demetriou was a member of the North Queensland coaching staff in the side's 17–16 Grand Final victory over Brisbane.

In January 2016, Demetriou joined the St. George Illawarra Dragons as an assistant coach and as head coach to their NSW Cup feeder team, the Illawarra Cutters. In September 2016, he was named coach of the 2016 Intrust Super Premiership NSW Team of the Year. He went on to win the grand final with the Cutters that year. 

In 2017, Demetriou joined Brisbane under head coach Wayne Bennett. He took over as the side's attacking coach in Round 6 of the 2018 NRL season, with the side scoring the second most tries in the competition from that point forward.

In December 2018, he joined South Sydney as an assistant coach, following Bennett to the club. In February 2020, it was announced that Demetriou would succeed Bennett as head coach at the end of the 2021 NRL season. On 6 August 2020, it was announced Demetriou would make his coaching debut for the South Sydney Rabbitohs after head coach Wayne Bennett breached the NRL's COVID-19 protocols. His first match as coach saw the South Sydney club defeat Brisbane by 28–10 at ANZ Stadium in Sydney.

Following the conclusion of the 2021 NRL season, he replaced the outgoing Bennett as the new head coach of South Sydney.  In his first official game in charge, South Sydney were defeated 11-4 by Brisbane at Suncorp Stadium.  In round 3 of the 2022 NRL season, he earned his first win in charge of South Sydney against arch rivals the Sydney Roosters.
In his first full season at South Sydney, he guided the club to their fifth straight preliminary final.  Souths took an early 12-0 lead over Penrith but were eventually defeated 32-12.

References

External links
Player statistics at rugbyleagueproject.org
Coaching statistics at rugbyleagueproject.org

1976 births
Living people
Australian expatriate rugby league players
Australian expatriate sportspeople in Canada
Australian expatriate sportspeople in Greece
Australian expatriate sportspeople in England
Australian people of Canadian descent
Australian people of Greek Cypriot descent
Australian rugby league coaches
Australian rugby league players
Canada national rugby league team players
Canadian people of Australian descent
Canadian people of Greek Cypriot descent
Canadian expatriate sportspeople in England
Chorley Lynx players
Expatriate rugby league players in England
Keighley Cougars coaches
Keighley Cougars players
Northern Pride RLFC coaches
Rochdale Hornets players
Rugby league centres
Rugby league five-eighths
Rugby league fullbacks
Rugby league locks
Rugby league players from Sydney
Rugby league second-rows
Rugby league utility players
Rugby league wingers
South Sydney Rabbitohs coaches
Sportsmen from New South Wales
Wakefield Trinity captains
Wakefield Trinity players
Widnes Vikings players